Philomena (c. 291–c. 304) was a young woman believed by some to have been a Christian martyr.

Other people named Philomena include:

Petrus de Dacia (mathematician), 13th-century Danish mathematician also called Philomena

Philomena Begley (born 1950), Irish country music singer

Philomena Essed (born 1955), Dutch-born professor of race, gender and leadership studies 
Philomena Garvey (1926–2009), Irish golfer 
Philomena Gianfrancisco (1923–1992), outfielder in the All-American Girls Professional Baseball League
Philomena Lee (born 1933), Irish nurse forced to give up her baby for adoption
Philomena, a 2013 film based on Philomena Lee's story
Philomena Mantella, American university administrator
Philomena McDonagh, English actress and writer
Philomena Mensah (born 1975), Canadian sprinter
Philomena Muinzer, dramaturge and former musician

In fiction
Philomena Cunk, a dim-witted British interviewer and commentator portrayed by Diane Morgan

See also
Filomena, a variant form of Philomena
Philomina, a Malayalam film actress

Feminine given names